The 2nd constituency of Aude is a French legislative constituency in the Aude département.

It is located in the east of the Department running from north to south, including the Mediterranean coast, centred on the town of Narbonne.

Deputies

Election results

2022

 
 
 
 
 
 
 
 
|-
| colspan="8" bgcolor="#E9E9E9"|
|-

2017

2012

|- style="background:#e9e9e9; text-align:center;"
! colspan="2" rowspan="2" style="text-align:left;" | Candidate
! rowspan="2" colspan="2" style="text-align:left;" | Party
! colspan="2" | 1st round
! colspan="2" | 2nd round
|- style="background:#e9e9e9; text-align:center;"
! style="width:75px;"| Votes
! style="width:30px;"| %
! style="width:75px;"| Votes
! style="width:30px;"| %
|-
| style="background-color:" |
| style="text-align:left;" | Marie-Hélène Fabre
| style="text-align:left;" | Socialist Party
| PS
| 
| 26.84%
| 
| 56.83%
|-
| style="background-color:" |
| style="text-align:left;" | Michel Py
| style="text-align:left;" | Union for a Popular Movement
| UMP
| 
| 23.14%
| 
| 43.17%
|-
| style="background-color:" |
| style="text-align:left;" | Didier Codorniou
| style="text-align:left;" | Miscellaneous Left
| DVG
| 
| 21.89%
| colspan="2" style="text-align:left;" |
|-
| style="background-color:" |
| style="text-align:left;" | Laure-Emmanuelle Philippe
| style="text-align:left;" | National Front
| FN
| 
| 18.80%
| colspan="2" style="text-align:left;" |
|-
| style="background-color:" |
| style="text-align:left;" | Jean-Paul Tournissa
| style="text-align:left;" | Left Front
| FG
| 
| 5.91%
| colspan="2" style="text-align:left;" |
|-
| style="background-color:" |
| style="text-align:left;" | Laurence Funès
| style="text-align:left;" | Far Right
| EXD
| 
| 0.74%
| colspan="2" style="text-align:left;" |
|-
| style="background-color:" |
| style="text-align:left;" | Flora Biendicho
| style="text-align:left;" | New Centre-Presidential Majority
| NCE
| 
| 0.58%
| colspan="2" style="text-align:left;" |
|-
| style="background-color:" |
| style="text-align:left;" | Patricia Cantegrel
| style="text-align:left;" | Miscellaneous Right
| DVD
| 
| 0.53%
| colspan="2" style="text-align:left;" |
|-
| style="background-color:" |
| style="text-align:left;" | Paule Chatain
| style="text-align:left;" | Miscellaneous Left
| DVG
| 
| 0.49%
| colspan="2" style="text-align:left;" |
|-
| style="background-color:" |
| style="text-align:left;" | Laurent Billirat
| style="text-align:left;" | Miscellaneous Left
| DVG
| 
| 0.39%
| colspan="2" style="text-align:left;" |
|-
| style="background-color:" |
| style="text-align:left;" | André Sarfati
| style="text-align:left;" | Ecologist
| ECO
| 
| 0.38%
| colspan="2" style="text-align:left;" |
|-
| style="background-color:" |
| style="text-align:left;" | Annette Vigier
| style="text-align:left;" | Far Left
| EXG
| 
| 0.32%
| colspan="2" style="text-align:left;" |
|-
| colspan="8" style="background:#e9e9e9;"|
|- style="font-weight:bold"
| colspan="4" style="text-align:left;" | Total
| 
| 100%
| 
| 100%
|-
| colspan="8" style="background:#e9e9e9;"|
|-
| colspan="4" style="text-align:left;" | Registered voters
| 
| style="background:#e9e9e9;"|
| 
| style="background:#e9e9e9;"|
|-
| colspan="4" style="text-align:left;" | Blank/Void ballots
| 
| 1.68%
| 
| 5.77%
|-
| colspan="4" style="text-align:left;" | Turnout
| 
| 61.63%
| 
| 58.60%
|-
| colspan="4" style="text-align:left;" | Abstentions
| 
| 38.37%
| 
| 41.40%
|-
| colspan="8" style="background:#e9e9e9;"|
|- style="font-weight:bold"
| colspan="6" style="text-align:left;" | Result
| colspan="2" style="background-color:" | PS HOLD
|}

2007

|- style="background:#e9e9e9; text-align:center;"
! colspan="2" rowspan="2" style="text-align:left;" | Candidate
! rowspan="2" colspan="2" style="text-align:left;" | Party
! colspan="2" | 1st round
! colspan="2" | 2nd round
|- style="background:#e9e9e9; text-align:center;"
! style="width:75px;"| Votes
! style="width:30px;"| %
! style="width:75px;"| Votes
! style="width:30px;"| %
|-
| style="background-color:" |
| style="text-align:left;" | Jacques Bascou
| style="text-align:left;" | Socialist Party
| PS
| 
| 37.61%
| 
| 53.65%
|-
| style="background-color:" |
| style="text-align:left;" | Michel Py
| style="text-align:left;" | Union for a Popular Movement
| UMP
| 
| 39.35%
| 
| 46.35%
|-
| style="background-color:" |
| style="text-align:left;" | Jean-Pierre Nadal
| style="text-align:left;" | National Front
| FN
| 
| 5.08%
| colspan="2" style="text-align:left;" |
|-
| style="background-color:" |
| style="text-align:left;" | Patric Roux
| style="text-align:left;" | Communist
| COM
| 
| 4.74%
| colspan="2" style="text-align:left;" |
|-
| style="background-color:" |
| style="text-align:left;" | Alain Sohier
| style="text-align:left;" | Democratic Movement
| MoDem
| 
| 4.28%
| colspan="2" style="text-align:left;" |
|-
| style="background-color:" |
| style="text-align:left;" | Françis Schroeder
| style="text-align:left;" | Far Left
| EXG
| 
| 2.50%
| colspan="2" style="text-align:left;" |
|-
| style="background-color:" |
| style="text-align:left;" | Fabienne Decaens
| style="text-align:left;" | The Greens
| VEC
| 
| 2.00%
| colspan="2" style="text-align:left;" |
|-
| style="background-color:" |
| style="text-align:left;" | Hélène Escudie
| style="text-align:left;" | Hunting, Fishing, Nature, Traditions
| CPNT
| 
| 1.59%
| colspan="2" style="text-align:left;" |
|-
| style="background-color:" |
| style="text-align:left;" | Stéphane Imbert
| style="text-align:left;" | Ecologist
| ECO
| 
| 0.88%
| colspan="2" style="text-align:left;" |
|-
| style="background-color:" |
| style="text-align:left;" | André Cau
| style="text-align:left;" | Far Right
| EXD
| 
| 0.63%
| colspan="2" style="text-align:left;" |
|-
| style="background-color:" |
| style="text-align:left;" | Véronique Kontowicz
| style="text-align:left;" | Far Left
| EXG
| 
| 0.51%
| colspan="2" style="text-align:left;" |
|-
| style="background-color:" |
| style="text-align:left;" | Elise Carpentier
| style="text-align:left;" | Majorité Présidentielle
| 
| 
| 0.51%
| colspan="2" style="text-align:left;" |
|-
| style="background-color:" |
| style="text-align:left;" | Yannick Amiard
| style="text-align:left;" | Far Left
| EXG
| 
| 0.32%
| colspan="2" style="text-align:left;" |
|-
| style="background-color:" |
| style="text-align:left;" | Denis Verdier
| style="text-align:left;" | Divers
| DIV
| 
| 0.00%
| colspan="2" style="text-align:left;" |
|-
| colspan="8" style="background:#e9e9e9;"|
|- style="font-weight:bold"
| colspan="4" style="text-align:left;" | Total
| 
| 100%
| 
| 100%
|-
| colspan="8" style="background:#e9e9e9;"|
|-
| colspan="4" style="text-align:left;" | Registered voters
| 
| style="background:#e9e9e9;"|
| 
| style="background:#e9e9e9;"|
|-
| colspan="4" style="text-align:left;" | Blank/Void ballots
| 
| 1.98%
| 
| 3.08%
|-
| colspan="4" style="text-align:left;" | Turnout
| 
| 64.11%
| 
| 67.40%
|-
| colspan="4" style="text-align:left;" | Abstentions
| 
| 35.89%
| 
| 32.60%
|-
| colspan="8" style="background:#e9e9e9;"|
|- style="font-weight:bold"
| colspan="6" style="text-align:left;" | Result
| colspan="2" style="background-color:" | PS HOLD
|}

2002

 
 
 
 
 
 
|-
| colspan="8" style="background:#e9e9e9;"|
|-

1997

 
 
 
 
 
 
 
|-
| colspan="8" style="background:#e9e9e9;"|
|-

References

Sources
 French Interior Ministry results website: 

2